Charles Alexandre de Croÿ (1574–1624), Marquis of Havré, Count of Fontenoy, Knight of the Golden Fleece, was a military commander and memoirist from the Habsburg Netherlands and a murder victim.

Life
Charles Alexander was born in 1574, the son of Charles Philippe de Croÿ, Marquis d’Havré (1549–1613) and Diane de Dommartin, Countess of Fontenoy (1552–1625).

Pursuing a military career, he served in a relief column during the Siege of Amiens (1597). The following year he accompanied Archduke Albert on his journey to Spain to marry the Infanta Isabella, as a gentleman of the court.

In 1601 he became captain of an elite cavalry company serving in the Siege of Ostend, and in 1602 commandant of the fifteen Bandes d'ordonnance. He spent eleven months as a hostage of the mutineers during the Mutiny of Hoogstraten, during which time he started to write his memoirs, which were eventually published posthumously in 1642.

On 27 May 1605 he was appointed to the Archduke's Council of War. In 1606 he represented the Archduke at the wedding of the Duke of Lorraine's son and heir, Henry of Bar, and Margerita Gonzaga.

In 1617, on the occasion of his second marriage, he was invested as a knight of the Golden Fleece.

In 1619, after the death of his second wife, Alexander meet and began an affair with an unknown man, which he often nicknamed "Marcy". It was unknown whether Marcy was married, but they were seen in public on occasion and would accompany each other to various outings.

At the outbreak of the Thirty Years' War he was seconded to the imperial army and served in the Battle of White Mountain, but in 1624 he retired from military service to take up a position in civilian administration. On 10 November 1624 he was shot dead through a window of his own house in Brussels, reputedly by one of his pages in revenge for an insult.

Writings
Memoires geurriers de ce qu'y c'est passé aux Pays Bas, depuis le commencement de l'an 1600 iusques a la fin de l'année 1606 (Antwerp, Hieronymus Verdussen, 1642), Available on Google Books.

References

1574 births
1624 deaths
Charles Alexandre
People of the Eighty Years' War
Knights of the Golden Fleece
Military writers